The advanced heavy-water reactor (AHWR) or AHWR-300 is the latest Indian design for a next-generation nuclear reactor that burns thorium in its fuel core. It is slated to form the third stage in India's three-stage fuel-cycle plan.  This phase of the fuel cycle plan was supposed to be built starting with a 300MWe prototype in 2016.  construction has not started and a firm date has not been set.

Background
Bhabha Atomic Research Centre (BARC) set up a large infrastructure to facilitate the design and development of these Advanced Heavy Water reactors. Things to be included range from materials technologies, critical components, reactor physics, and safety analysis. Several facilities have been set up to experiment with these reactors. The AHWR is a pressure tube type of heavy water reactor. The Government of India, Department of Atomic Energy (DAE), is fully funding the future development, the current development, and the design of the Advanced Heavy Water Reactor. The new version of Advanced Heavy Water Reactors will be equipped with more general safety requirements. India is the base for these reactors due to India's large Thorium reserves; therefore, it is more geared for continual use and operation of the AHWR.

Motivation

Thorium is three times more abundant in the Earth's crust than uranium, though less abundant in terms of economically viable to extract proven reserves, with India holding the largest proven reserves of any country. A lot of thorium is also contained in the tailings of mines that extract rare earth elements from monazite which usually contains both rare earth elements and thorium. As long as demand for thorium remains low, these tailings present a chemical (thorium is a toxic heavy metal) and - to a lesser extent - radiological issue which would be solved at least in part by use of thorium in nuclear power plants. Unlike Uranium, which is composed of over 99% fertile but not fissile  and only to roughly 0.72% of fissile , Thorium is composed almost entirely out of fertile  which can be readily transmutated into fissile  using thermal neutrons. This allows a much larger share of the original material to be used without the need for fast breeder reactors and while producing orders of magnitude less minor actinides.

Design
The proposed design of the AHWR is that of a heavy-water-moderated nuclear power reactor that will be the next generation of the PHWR type. It is being developed at Bhabha Atomic Research Centre (BARC), in Mumbai, India and aims to meet the objectives of using thorium fuel cycles for commercial power generation. The AHWR is a vertical pressure tube type reactor cooled by boiling light water under natural circulation. A unique feature of this design is a large tank of water on top of the primary containment vessel, called the gravity-driven water pool (GDWP). This reservoir is designed to perform several passive safety functions.

The overall design of the AHWR is to utilize large amounts of thorium and the thorium cycle. The AHWR is much like that of the pressurized heavy water reactor (PHWR), in that they share similarities in the concept of the pressure tubes and calandria tubes, but the tubes' orientation in the AHWR is vertical, unlike that of the PHWR. The AHWR's core is 3.5 m long and has 513 lattice locations in a square pitch of 225 mm. The core is radially divided into three burn up regions. The burn up decreases as it moves toward the external surface of the core. Fuel is occupied by 452 lattice locations and the remaining 37 locations are occupied by shutdown system-1. This consists of 37 shut-off rods, 24 locations are for reactive control devices which are consisted of 8 absorber rods, 8 shim rods, and 8 regulating rods. By boiling light water at a pressure of 7 MPa, heat is then removed. The main focus with this model is to get the total power and a coarse spatial power distribution within the core to be within certain degree of accuracy.

The reactor design incorporates advanced technologies, together with several proven positive features of Indian pressurised heavy water reactors (PHWRs). These features include pressure tube type design, low pressure moderator, on-power refueling, diverse fast acting shut-down systems, and availability of a large low temperature heat sink around the reactor core. The AHWR incorporates several passive safety features. These include: Core heat removal through natural circulation; direct injection of emergency core coolant system (ECCS) water in fuel; and the availability of a large inventory of borated water in overhead gravity-driven water pool (GDWP) to facilitate sustenance of core decay heat removal. The emergency core cooling system (ECCS) injection and containment cooling can act (SCRAM) without invoking any active systems or operator action.

The reactor physics design is tuned to maximise the use of thorium based fuel, by achieving a slightly negative void coefficient.  Fulfilling these requirements has been possible through the use of PuO2-ThO2 MOX, and ThO2-233UO2 MOX in different pins of the same fuel cluster, and the use of a heterogeneous moderator consisting of amorphous carbon (in the fuel bundles) and heavy water in 80–20% volume ratio. The core configuration lends itself to considerable flexibility and several feasible solutions, including those not requiring the use of amorphous carbon based reflectors, are possible without any changes in reactor structure.

Some Distinctive Features of AHWR 
 Elimination of high-pressure heavy water coolant resulting in reduction of heavy water leakage losses, and eliminating heavy water recovery system. 
 Recovery of heat generated in the moderator for feed water heating.  
 Elimination of major components and  equipment such  as primary coolant pumps and drive motors, associated control and power supply equipment and corresponding saving of electrical power required to run these pumps. 
 Shop assembled coolant channels, with features to enable quick replacement of pressure tube alone, without affecting other installed channel components. 
 Replacement of steam generators by simpler steam drums. 
 Higher steam pressure than in PHWRs. 
 Production  of  500  m3/day  of  demineralised  water  in  Multi  Effect  Desalination Plant by using steam from LP Turbine. 
 Hundred year design life of the reactor.
 A  design  objective  of  requiring  no  exclusion  zone  on  account  of  its  advanced safety features.

Fuel cycle
The AHWR at standard is set to be a closed nuclear fuel cycle because this will lead to reduction in radio-toxicity. Because of this, the AHWR has alternate fuel options, given it has diverse fuel cycles. It can do closed types and once-through types of fuel cycles. The overall aspect of the AHWR is primed for high burn up with thorium-based fuel (BARC, 2013). Recycled thorium that is recovered from the reactor is then sent back, and plutonium is stored to be later used  for a fast breeder reactor.

The fuel for AHWR would be manufactured by the Advanced Fuel Fabrication Facility, which is under the direction of Bhabha Atomic Research Centre (BARC) Tarapur. AFFF is currently working on PFBR fuel rod production. AFFF has been associated with fuel rod fabrication for other research purposes in the past. AFFF is the only nuclear fuel production facility in the world which has dealt with uranium, plutonium and thorium.

Future plans
Indian Government announced in 2013 it would build an AHWR of 300 MWe with its location to be decided. As of 2017, the design was in the final stages of validation.

Safety innovation
Past nuclear meltdowns such as Chernobyl and Fukushima have made the improvement of construction and maintenance of facilities to be crucial. These accidents were with the involvement of uranium-235 reactors and the poor structures of the facilities they were in. Since then, International Atomic nuclear Association has stepped up protocols in nuclear facilities in order to prevent these accidents from occurring again. One of the top security measures for a meltdown is containment of radioactivity from escaping the reactor.  The Defence in Depth (DiD) is a method used in nuclear facilities to acquire the most effective practice of radioactive containment. The AWHR has acquired the Defense in Depth process which is used in reactors by providing a list of provisions and required equipment in order to retain the radioactivity in the core. The Defense in Depth method sets regulations that must be followed in order to reduce human error incidents and machine malfunctions.

The procedures are the following: 
 Level 1: Prevention of abnormal operation and failure
 Level 2: Control of abnormal operation and detection of failure
 Level 3: Control of accidents within the design basis
 Level 4: Control of severe plant conditions, including prevention of accident progression and mitigation of consequences of severe accidents
 Level 5: Mitigation of radiological consequences of significant release of radioactive materials.

The AWHR is an innovation in renewable energy safety as it will limit the use of fissile uranium-235 to breeding fissile uranium-233 from fertile thorium-232. The extraction of nuclear energy from the 90th element Thorium is said to have more energy than the world's oil, coal, and uranium combined. The AHWR has safety features that distinguish it from conventional lightwater nuclear reactors. Some of these features consist of: strong safety systems, reduction of heat from core through a built in cooling system, multiple shutdown systems and a fail-safe procedure that consist of a poison that shuts down the system in the case of a technical failure (FBR). The potential threat scientists try to avoid in reactors is the buildup of heat because nuclear energy escalates when it reacts with high temperatures, high pressures and chemical reactions. The AHWR has features that helps reduce the probability of this occurrence through: negative reactivity coefficients, low power density, low excess reactivity in the core and proper selection of material attributes built in.

Technical specifications

See also 

 Advanced CANDU reactor
 Breeder reactor
 Generation IV reactor
 Pressurised heavy-water reactor
 Thorium fuel cycle
 India's three-stage nuclear power programme
 Parallel_approaches

References

External links 
 Advanced Heavy Water Reactor (AHWR) now being designed in Bhabha Atomic Research Centre 
 Advanced Heavy Water Reactor. Sept 2008 Detailed design and diagrams
http://www.barc.gov.in/reactor/ahwr.pdf

Heavy water reactors
Nuclear power reactor types